Tillandsia recurvifolia is a species in the genus Tillandsia. This species is native to Bolivia, Paraguay, Uruguay, Argentina, and Brazil.

Cultivars
 Tillandsia 'Cotton Candy'
 Tillandsia 'Flaming Cascade'
 Tillandsia 'Flaming Spire'
 Tillandsia 'Gildora'
 Tillandsia 'Houston'
 Tillandsia 'Mystic Circle'
 Tillandsia 'Ned Kelly'
 Tillandsia 'Oboe'
 Tillandsia 'Really Red'
 Tillandsia 'Southern Cross'
 Tillandsia 'White Star'

References

recurvifolia
Flora of South America
Epiphytes
Plants described in 1861